Parliamentary elections were held in Slovenia on 21 September 2008 to elect the 90 deputies of the National Assembly. 17 parties filed to run in the election, including all nine parliamentary parties. The election was won by the Social Democrats (SD), who then went on to form a government together with Zares, Liberal Democracy of Slovenia (LDS) and the Democratic Party of Pensioners of Slovenia (DeSUS).

Opinion polls

Exit polls
According to exit polls, conducted by the Interstat agency for Radiotelevizija Slovenija, Social Democrats (SD) won the most votes, 32.02%. Slovenian Democratic Party (SDS) finished second with 28.04%. Other parties followed: Zares 10.05%, Democratic Party of Pensioners of Slovenia (DeSUS) 6.74%, Slovenian National Party (SNS) 5.58%, Liberal Democracy of Slovenia (LDS) 5.21%, and Slovenian People's Party (SLS) with Youth Party of Slovenia (SMS) 4.28%. New Slovenia (NSi) and Lipa, the parliamentary parties before the elections, did not reach the 4% limit.

According to exit polls, conducted by the Mediana agency for POP TV, the results are following: SD 31.5%, SDS 27.7%, Zares 9.7%, DeSUS 7.6%, LDS 6.1%, SNS 5.8%, SLS-SMS 4.2%. The margin was not reached by NSi (2.6%) and Lipa (2.3%).

Results

See also 
Patria case

References

External links

 NSD: European Election Database - Slovenia publishes regional level election data; allows for comparisons of election results, 1992–2008

Parliamentary elections in Slovenia
Slovenia
2008 in Slovenia
September 2008 events in Europe